Scrobipalpa audax is a moth in the family Gelechiidae. It was described by Povolný in 1966. It is found in Algeria.

The forewings are whitish with scattered groups of grey-blackish scales. The hindwings are silvery white.

References

Scrobipalpa
Moths described in 1966